IBG may refer to:

 Idaho Botanical Garden
 Indiana Botanic Gardens
 Institute for Behavioral Genetics
 Intel Boot Guard, a security mechanism implemented in some Intel processors
 Interactive Brokers Group, an automated electronic market maker and broker
 Investment Bank of Greece
 Interbank GIRO, a mechanism of money transfer
 The International Brewers Guild, which merged with the Institute of Brewing to form the Institute of Brewing and Distilling
 The Institute of British Geographers, now part of the Royal Geographical Society